Sean Warfield Smith (born May 29, 1967) is a former American football defensive end in the National Football League. He played two seasons for the New England Patriots (1990–1991).

References 

1967 births
Living people
Players of American football from Cincinnati
American football defensive ends
Georgia Tech Yellow Jackets football players
New England Patriots players